Mountain Home Junior High School is a three-year public junior high in Mountain Home, Idaho. It is the only traditional junior high school in the Mountain Home School District (#193). It serves around 1,000 students in grades 7 and 8 in Mountain Home and the surrounding area. It is located at 1600 East 2nd Street in Mountain Home, Idaho.

References

External links
 

Public middle schools in Idaho
Schools in Elmore County, Idaho
Mountain Home, Idaho